John Owen is a British Formula One engineer. He is currently the chief designer at the Mercedes AMG Petronas Motorsport Formula One team.

Career
Owen started his career in motorsport in Brackley in 2001, working as an aerodynamicist for chassis manufacturer Reynard Motorsport. A year later, he moved to Hinwil, Switzerland, to work for the Sauber team. In 2004, he was promoted to a senior aerodynamicist for the Swiss outfit. Three years later, he returned to Brackley as principal aerodynamicist for Honda. In 2010 he was promoted to Chief Designer for the Mercedes works team. He currently leads the engineering team at Mercedes. Owen was integral to the creation of DAS (Dual Axis Steering).

Career timeline
 Aerodynamicist – Reynard Motorsport (2001)
 Aerodynamicist – Sauber (2002–2004)
 Senior aerodynamicist – Sauber (2004–2007)
 Principal aerodynamicist – Honda (2007–2008)
 Principal aerodynamicist – Brawn GP (2009)
 Chief designer – Mercedes AMG Petronas Motorsport (2010–)

References

1973 births
Living people
Formula One designers
Aerodynamicists
British motorsport designers
21st-century British engineers
Mercedes-Benz in Formula One